The Observer is a British newspaper published on Sundays. It is a sister paper to The Guardian and The Guardian Weekly, whose parent company Guardian Media Group Limited acquired it in 1993. First published in 1791, it is the world's oldest Sunday newspaper.

History

Origins
The first issue, published on 4 December 1791 by W.S. Bourne, was the world's first Sunday newspaper. Believing that the paper would be a means of wealth, Bourne instead soon found himself facing debts of nearly £1,600. Though early editions purported editorial independence, Bourne attempted to cut his losses and sell the title to the government. When this failed, Bourne's brother (a wealthy businessman) made an offer to the government, which also refused to buy the paper but agreed to subsidise it in return for influence over its editorial content. As a result, the paper soon took a strong line against radicals such as Thomas Paine, Francis Burdett and Joseph Priestley.

19th century
In 1807, the brothers decided to relinquish editorial control, naming Lewis Doxat as the new editor. Seven years later, the brothers sold The Observer to William Innell Clement, a newspaper proprietor who owned a number of publications. The paper continued to receive government subsidies during this period; in 1819, of the approximately 23,000 copies of the paper distributed weekly, approximately 10,000 were given away as "specimen copies", distributed by postmen who were paid to deliver them to "lawyers, doctors, and gentlemen of the town." 

Clement maintained ownership of The Observer until his death in 1852. After Doxat retired in 1857, Clement's heirs sold the paper to Joseph Snowe, who also took over the editor's chair. 

In 1870, wealthy businessman Julius Beer bought the paper and appointed Edward Dicey as editor, whose efforts succeeded in reviving circulation. Though Beer's son Frederick became the owner upon Julius's death in 1880, he had little interest in the newspaper and was content to leave Dicey as editor until 1889. Henry Duff Traill took over the editorship after Dicey's departure, only to be replaced in 1891 by Frederick's wife, Rachel Beer, of the Sassoon family. She remained as editor for thirteen years, combining it in 1893 with the editorship of The Sunday Times, a newspaper that she had also bought.

20th century
Upon Frederick's death in 1903, the paper was purchased by the newspaper magnate Lord Northcliffe. Northcliffe sold the paper to William Waldorf Astor in 1911, who transferred ownership to his son Waldorf Astor, 2nd Viscount Astor four years later. Garvin's departed as editor in 1942.

Ownership passed to Waldorf's sons in 1948, with David taking over as editor. He remained in the position for 27 years, during which time he turned it into a trust-owned newspaper employing, among others, George Orwell, Paul Jennings and C. A. Lejeune. In 1977, the Astors sold the ailing newspaper to US oil giant Atlantic Richfield (now called ARCO) who sold it to Lonrho plc in 1981.

It became part of the Guardian Media Group in June 1993, after a rival bid to acquire it by The Independent was rejected.

Farzad Bazoft, a journalist for The Observer, was executed in Iraq in 1990 on charges of spying. In 2003, The Observer interviewed the Iraqi colonel who had arrested and interrogated Bazoft and who was convinced that Bazoft was not a spy.

21st century
On 27 February 2005, The Observer Blog was launched. In addition to the weekly Observer Magazine colour supplement which is still present every Sunday, for several years each issue of The Observer came with a different free monthly magazine. These magazines had the titles Observer Sport Monthly, Observer Music Monthly, Observer Woman and Observer Food Monthly.

Content from The Observer is included in The Guardian Weekly for an international readership.

The Observer followed its daily partner The Guardian and converted to Berliner format on Sunday 8 January 2006.

The Observer was awarded the National Newspaper of the Year at the British Press Awards 2007. Editor Roger Alton stepped down at the end of 2007, and was replaced by his deputy, John Mulholland.

In early 2010, the paper was restyled. An article on the paper's website previewing the new version stated that "The News section, which will incorporate Business and personal finance, will be home to a new section, Seven Days, offering a complete round-up of the previous week's main news from Britain and around the world, and will also focus on more analysis and comment."

In July 2021, Ofcom announced that The Guardian continued to be the UK's most widely used newspaper website and app for news and had increased its audience share by 1% over the preceding year. 23% of consumers, who used websites or apps for news, used The Guardian, which also hosts The Observer online content. This compared to 22% for the Daily Mail website.

Supplements and features
After the paper was rejuvenated in early 2010, the main paper came with only a small number of supplements – Sport, The Observer Magazine, The New Review and The New York Times International Weekly, an 8-page supplement of articles selected from The New York Times that has been distributed with the paper since 2007. Every four weeks the paper includes The Observer Food Monthly magazine, and in September 2013 it launched Observer Tech Monthly, a science and technology section which won the Grand Prix at the 2014 Newspaper Awards.

Previously, the main paper had come with a larger range of supplements including Sport, Business & Media, Review, Escape (a travel supplement), The Observer Magazine and various special interest monthlies, such as The Observer Food Monthly, Observer Women monthly which was launched in 2006, Observer Sport Monthly and The Observer Film Magazine.

The Newsroom
The Observer and its sister newspaper The Guardian operate a visitor centre in London called The Newsroom.  It contains their archives, including bound copies of old editions, a photographic library and other items such as diaries, letters and notebooks. This material may be consulted by members of the public.  The Newsroom also mounts temporary exhibitions and runs an educational programme for schools.

In November 2007, The Observer and The Guardian made their archives available over the Internet. The current extent of the archives available are 1791 to 2000 for The Observer and 1821 to 2000 for The Guardian.  These archives will eventually go up to 2003. In 2023 copies from 2004 onwards and gaps will be filled to latest edition.

Bans
The paper was banned in Egypt in February 2008 after reprinting cartoons allegedly insulting Muhammed.

Editors
 W. S. Bourne & W. H. Bourne (1791–1807)
 Lewis Doxat (1807–1857)
 Joseph Snowe (1857–1870)
 Edward Dicey (1870–1889)
 Henry Duff Traill (1889–1891)
 Rachel Beer (1891–1904)
 Austin Harrison (1904–1908)
 James Louis Garvin (1908–1942)
 Ivor Brown (1942–1948)
 David Astor (1948–1975)
 Donald Trelford (1975–1993)
 Jonathan Fenby (1993–1995)
 Andrew Jaspan (1995–1996)
 Will Hutton (1996–1998)
 Roger Alton (1998–2007)
 John Mulholland (2008–2018)
Paul Webster (2018–present)

Photographers
 Jane Bown (resident from 1949 until her death in 2014)
 Stuart Heydinger (1960–1966)
 Antonio Olmos (freelance)
 Harry Borden (freelance)
 Michael Peto (freelance)
 Colin Jones (freelance)
 Dean Chalkley (freelance)
 Don McCullin (freelance)
 Philip Jones Griffiths (freelance)
 Giles Duley (freelance)

Awards
The Observer was named the British Press Awards National Newspaper of the Year for 2006. Its supplements have three times won "Regular Supplement of the Year" (Sport Monthly, 2001; Food Monthly, 2006, 2012).

Observer journalists have won a range of British Press Awards, including
 "Interviewer of the Year" (Lynn Barber, 2001; Sean O'Hagan, 2002; Rachel Cooke, 2005; Chrissy Iley (freelance for Observer and Sunday Times magazine), 2007)
 "Critic of the Year" (Jay Rayner, 2005; Philip French, 2008; Rowan Moore, 2013)
 "Food & Drink Writer of the Year" (John Carlin, 2003)
 "Travel Writer of the Year" (Tim Moore, 2004)

See also 
 
 
 Anthony Howard
 Cambridge Apostles
 Observer Mace debating competition – now known as the John Smith Memorial Mace

References

Bibliography
 Richard Cockett (1990), David Astor and The Observer, André Deutsch, London. 294 pp. with index. .  Has endpapers that are facsimiles of The Observer, with other black-and-white photographic plates of personnel linked to the newspaper.
 Jane Bown (2015), A Lifetime of Looking, Faber & Faber Ltd.. Contains the most iconic photos she took for The Observer from 1949 to the last photo she took a few months before her death in December 2014.  Photos include The Beatles, Mick Jagger, the Queen, John Betjeman and Björk.

External links
 
 DigitalArchive paid-for service
 History of Guardian Media Group 1990–1999, Guardian Media Group website; as of 2 March 2003; GMGplc.co.uk (link requires Flash Player to view timeline)
 Observer timeline
 History of the Observer

 
1791 establishments in England
Centre-left newspapers
Guardian Media Group
Liberal media in the United Kingdom
National newspapers published in the United Kingdom
Publications established in 1791
Republicanism in the United Kingdom
Sunday newspapers published in the United Kingdom